Elroy Patrick Kromheer (born 15 January 1970) is a Dutch former footballer who played in The Football League for Reading and in the Scottish Football League for Motherwell.

Elroy was twice signed for £250,000, the first occasion was in July 1992 when he joined Motherwell from Volendam. The second occasion was when he joined Reading from Zwolle.

References

1970 births
Living people
Dutch footballers
Reading F.C. players
English Football League players
Footballers from Haarlem
FC Volendam players
Motherwell F.C. players
PEC Zwolle players
1. FC Nürnberg players
Almere City FC players
Scottish Football League players
Dutch expatriate footballers
Expatriate footballers in Scotland
Expatriate footballers in England
Dutch expatriate sportspeople in Scotland
Dutch expatriate sportspeople in England
Association football defenders